The 2020 ABN AMRO World Tennis Tournament (or Rotterdam Open) was a men's tennis tournament played on indoor hard courts. It took place at the Rotterdam Ahoy arena in the Dutch city of Rotterdam, between 10 and 16 February 2020. It was the 47th edition of the Rotterdam Open, and part of the ATP Tour 500 series on the 2020 ATP Tour. The tournament also included a Men's Wheelchair Tennis Singles and Doubles draw.

Singles main-draw entrants

Seeds 

1 Rankings as of 3 February 2020.

Other entrants 
The following players received wildcards into the main draw:
  Tallon Griekspoor
  Robin Haase 
  Jannik Sinner

The following player received entry as a special exempt:
  Vasek Pospisil

The following players received entry from the qualifying draw:
  Grégoire Barrère 
  Márton Fucsovics 
  Philipp Kohlschreiber 
  Mikhail Kukushkin

Withdrawals 
Before the tournament
  Lucas Pouille → replaced by  Aljaž Bedene
  Jo-Wilfried Tsonga → replaced by  Gilles Simon
  Stan Wawrinka → replaced by  Alexander Bublik

During the tournament
  Radu Albot

Doubles main-draw entrants

Seeds 

1 Rankings as of February 3, 2020.

Other entrants 
The following pairs received wildcards into the doubles main draw:
  Sander Arends /  David Pel
  Stefanos Tsitsipas /  Nenad Zimonjić

The following pair received entry from the qualifying draw:
  Henri Kontinen /  Jan-Lennard Struff

Withdrawals 
During the tournament
  Fabio Fognini (leg injury)

Finals

Singles 

  Gaël Monfils defeated  Félix Auger-Aliassime, 6–2, 6–4

Doubles 

  Pierre-Hugues Herbert /  Nicolas Mahut defeated  Henri Kontinen /  Jan-Lennard Struff, 7–6(7–5), 4–6, [10–7]

References

External links 
 

 
ABN AMRO World Tennis Tournament
ABN AMRO World Tennis Tournament
ABN Amro World Tennis